Poecilanthrax effrenus is a species of bee flies (insects in the family Bombyliidae).

References

Further reading

External links

 
 

Bombyliidae
Articles created by Qbugbot
Insects described in 1887